Piero Postini (born 20 November 1904, date of death unknown) was an Italian wrestler. He competed in the men's Greco-Roman lightweight at the 1928 Summer Olympics.

References

External links
 

1904 births
Year of death missing
Italian male sport wrestlers
Olympic wrestlers of Italy
Wrestlers at the 1928 Summer Olympics
Sportspeople from Milan
20th-century Italian people